Scaled Composites (often called simply Scaled) is an American aerospace company founded by Burt Rutan and currently owned by Northrop Grumman. It is located at the Mojave Air and Space Port in Mojave, California, United States. Founded to develop experimental aircraft, the company now focuses on designing and developing concept craft and prototype fabrication processes for aircraft and other vehicles. It is known for unconventional designs, for its use of non-metal, composite materials, and for winning the Ansari X Prize with its experimental spacecraft SpaceShipOne.

Company history
Scaled Composites was established in 1982 and purchased by the Beech Aircraft Corporation in 1985, as a result of the collaboration on the Starship project. In 1988, Beech's parent company, Raytheon, sold Scaled back to Rutan, who then sold it to Wyman-Gordon. After Wyman-Gordon was acquired by Precision Castparts Corp., Rutan and ten investors re-acquired the company as Scaled Composites, LLC. Northrop Grumman, a major shareholder in the company with a 40% stake, said it would acquire the company outright on July 20, 2007. Both companies said Northrop Grumman's acquisition would not affect Scaled Composites' strategy or involve replacing Burt Rutan as senior manager. The acquisition by Northrop Grumman was completed on August 24, 2007. Rutan retired in April 2011. Ben Diachun, a long time employee, was president of Scaled from Oct 31, 2015 until April 2019. Cory Bird, another long time employee, became president of Scaled in April 2019

Early projects
Before forming Scaled Composites, Burt Rutan had designed several aircraft for amateur builders, including the VariEze, often considered one of general aviation's most innovative designs. He also designed the Beechcraft Starship, which was a commercial failure. These aircraft were distinctive because of their canard configuration, winglets and pusher propellers.

Before SpaceShipOne, Rutan was best known for his Voyager aircraft, which his brother, Dick Rutan, and Jeana Yeager flew around the world without refueling in 1986. In 2005, the single-jet Global Flyer was flown by billionaire adventurer Steve Fossett on the first solo non-stop, non-refueled flight around the world, and later in the longest flight in history: .

Although their role was not widely publicized, Rutan and John Roncz, who had provided aerodynamics support to a number of previous Rutan projects including Starship, helped design, and Scaled manufactured, the double slotted wing mast for the Stars & Stripes catamaran for Dennis Conner's entry in the 1988 America's Cup.

SpaceShipOne

The company announced in April 2003 that it was working on a privately funded spacecraft, in an attempt to win the Ansari X PRIZE for the first private crewed spaceflight. This experimental rocket-powered spacecraft was given the name SpaceShipOne. On December 17, 2003, they announced SpaceShipOne's first supersonic flight, the first flight of its kind by a privately funded aircraft. SpaceShipOne successfully made this flight, reaching  and 930 mph (Mach 1.2). The craft was taken aloft by the White Knight carrier aircraft. On the same day, Paul Allen, one of the founders of Microsoft, confirmed publicly the rumors that he was the angel investor behind the SpaceShipOne venture.

On April 1, 2004, the U.S. Department of Transportation issued the company what it called the world's first license for a sub-orbital crewed rocket flight. The license was approved by the Federal Aviation Administration's Office of Commercial Space Transportation, which has backed licenses for more than 150 commercial launches of uncrewed launch vehicles in its 20 years, but never a license for crewed flight on a sub-orbital trajectory. The Mojave Airport, operating part-time as Mojave Spaceport, is the launch point for SpaceShipOne. SpaceShipOne performed the first privately funded human spaceflight on June 21, 2004. Flight 16P on September 29, 2004 and Flight 17P on October 4, 2004 won the X-Prize for Scaled Composites and SpaceShipOne.

Stratolaunch Carrier Aircraft

Scaled Composites Model 351 (nicknamed the "Roc") was built for Stratolaunch Systems to provide a platform from which air-launch space missions can be staged.

In August 2015, Scaled Composites president Kevin Mickey stated the company has so far assembled "roughly 200,000 pounds of composite structure" for the vehicle and if put on a football field, "its wingtips would extend beyond the goalposts by 15 feet on each side."

It will require 12,000 feet of runway to lift-off.

Rutan Aircraft Factory aircraft

Burt Rutan created Rutan Aircraft Factory to market a commercial variation of his Model "VariViggen" prototype" he began building in his garage in 1968 which he called The Model 32, also known as the VariViggen SP. This model utilized a slightly longer fuselage, larger span and winglets in order to increase efficiency. Within 8 years after its founding, this company became one of the world's important aircraft design and prototyping companies. The Rutan Aircraft Factory sold over 600 plan sets for the VariViggen to homebuilders, and eventually about 20 of the aircraft were built. Following the crash of one in New Brunswick, Canada, in September 2006 due to wing tank fuel contamination, fewer than five are currently still flying. The prototype aircraft, N27VV, was donated to the EAA AirVenture Museum in 1988.

 Model 27 VariViggen (1972)
 Model 31 VariEze (1975)
 Model 32 VariViggen SP (1973)
 Model 33 VariEze (1976)
 Model 35 AD-1 (1979)
 Model 40/74 Defiant (1978)
 Model 54 Quickie (1978)
 Model 61 Long-EZ (1979)
 NASA AD-1 (1979)
 Model 68 AMSOIL Racer (1981)
 Model 73 NGT: Three-fifths scale model of Fairchild T-46 trainer (1981)
 Model 72 Grizzly (1982)
 Model 76 Voyager: First aircraft to circumnavigate the Earth non-refueled, non-stop (1986)
 Model 77 Solitaire (1982)
 Model 81 Catbird (1988) five-seat single-engine aircraft
 Model 202 Boomerang: (1996) Asymmetric 5 seat aircraft

Scaled Composites aircraft

Other aircraft projects 
 US flight based testing and evaluation of the GippsAero GA8 Airvan manufactured by GippsAero of Victoria, Australia, including flight evaluation of the external belly cargo pod.

Non-aircraft work 
 Stars & Stripes: The catamaran that formed Dennis Conner's American entry for the America's Cup yacht race (1988)
 Power Augmented Ram Landing Craft (PARLC): For the U.S. Navy
 General Motors Ultralite (1992)

Accidents and incidents
 On July 26, 2007, an explosion occurred during testing of SpaceShipTwo's systems, killing three employees and injuring three more.
 On October 31, 2014, the SpaceShipTwo VSS Enterprise broke apart during an in-flight powered test. The incident killed one pilot and severely injured the other, resulting in the total loss of the vehicle; both pilots were Scaled employees. On July 28, 2015, the NTSB released the final report on its investigation of the incident, concluding that for an unknown reason the pilot had released the "Feather" of SpaceShipTwo prematurely, leading directly to the craft's disintegration.

See also 
 NewSpace

References

External links

 
 Stargazer – The Ultimate Online Resource on Every Known Rutan Project
 Aerofiles data on various Rutan/Scaled projects
 Patents owned by Scaled Composites
 SpaceShipOne Motor Bulkhead Case Study 

 
2007 mergers and acquisitions
American companies established in 1982
Companies based in Kern County, California
Manufacturing companies based in Greater Los Angeles
Private spaceflight companies
Mojave Air and Space Port
Technology companies based in Greater Los Angeles
Technology companies established in 1982
Vehicle manufacturing companies established in 1982
1982 establishments in California
Northrop Grumman